Paolo Bartolomei (born 21 August 1989) is an Italian professional footballer who plays as a midfielder for  club Perugia.

Club career
He made his professional debut in the Lega Pro for Pontedera on 1 September 2013 in a game against Grosseto.

On 13 July 2018 he joined Serie B club Spezia.

On 11 January 2021 he moved to Cremonese.

On 1 September 2022, Bartolomei signed a two-year contract with Perugia.

References

External links
 
 

1989 births
Sportspeople from Lucca
Living people
Italian footballers
U.S. Massese 1919 players
U.S. Città di Pontedera players
Serie C players
S.S. Teramo Calcio players
A.C. Reggiana 1919 players
A.S. Cittadella players
Spezia Calcio players
U.S. Cremonese players
A.C. Perugia Calcio players
Serie A players
Serie B players
Association football midfielders
Footballers from Tuscany